The Cupa României is a football cup competition for Romanian teams which has been held annually since 1933–34, except during World War II. It is the country's main cup competition, being open to all clubs affiliated with the Romanian Football Federation (FRF) and the county football associations regardless of the league they belong to. Currently, the winner of the competition is granted a place in the UEFA Europa Conference League qualifiers and plays the Supercupa României.

Most finals have been held at the Stadionul Național (formerly known as "23 August"), and occasionally at other stadiums in Bucharest. During the construction of the new Stadionul Național, the final was staged each year in a different major city of the country. In 2007, the final was held in Timișoara at the Dan Păltinișanu stadium, this being the second occasion when the last game was played outside Bucharest (the first occurrence took place in 1989, when Brașov hosted the event). Then, the next three finals were staged in Piatra Neamț, Târgu Jiu, Iași and again in Brașov.

The competition has been dominated by Bucharest-based teams, the most successful performers being FCSB with twenty-three trophies, followed by Rapid București and Dinamo București with thirteen each. The record for the most consecutive Cups won is held by Rapid București, who won the Romanian Cup 6 times in a row, between 1937 and 1942.

Sponsorship

On 22 July 2005, FRF and Samsung Electronics signed a one-year sponsorship deal. The name of the competition was changed to Cupa României Samsung.

On 9 October 2006, FRF and Ursus Breweries (part of the SABMiller group) signed a sponsorship agreement for the next three seasons. Ursus Breweries changed the name of the competition to Cupa României Timișoreana, after the Timișoreana beer brand.

On 16 May 2016, FRF announced the rebranding of competition and the signing of contracts with new sponsors like Kaufland, UPC Broadband and Stanleybet.

On 20 October 2017, FRF announced that the new main sponsor of the competition is the betting company Casa Pariurilor.

Competition format
The competition has undergone minor changes in format over the years. The following format came in use in the 2009–10 season. The main differences between the current system and the last one are the dates at which rounds take place, and the two-legged format of the semifinals.

County phase
The competition at this phase is organized by the county football associations. Forty-two teams (one from each county) advance to the next phase.

National phase
The competition at this phase is organized by the Romanian Football Federation (FRF). For the first five rounds, teams are paired using geographical criteria in order to avoid long travel distances. The teams from a lower division or with a lower ranking in the last league season host the games.
 First round – 140 teams (42 teams qualified from the county phase and 98 Liga III teams)
 Second round – 80 teams (70 winners from the first round and the remaining 10 Liga III teams)
 Third round – 40 teams (winners from the second round)
 Fourth round – 56 teams (20 winners from the third round and all 36 Liga II teams)
 Fifth round – 28 teams (winners from the fourth round)
 Round of 32 – (14 winners from the fifth round and all 18 Liga I teams)

Starting with this round a seeding system is used for the draw, as follows:
 Pot A: Teams 1–6 from last season's Liga I final table (6 teams)
 Pot B: The remaining Liga I teams (12 teams)
 Pot C: Teams from the lower divisions (14 teams)

Teams from pot A are paired with teams from pot C, then the eight remaining pot C teams are paired with pot B teams, with the lower league clubs hosting the games. The four remaining pot B teams will play each other, with the host club determined by means of a draw.
 Round of 16 (winners from the Round of 32)
 Quarterfinals
 Semifinals
 Final

Every year, based on the national and international football calendar, FRF's executive committee may choose a two-leg or one-leg system for the round of 16, quarterfinals and semifinals. Games at these stages are, when played using a one-leg system, hosted by a neutral venue. The final is held at a pre-established venue, normally in Bucharest.

Results of the Finals

Performances

Performance by club
The performance of various clubs is shown in the following table:

Performance by city
The following table sorts cities by the number of Cups won by local teams. Bucharest, hosting the three most decorated sides in the competition and having staged the majority of the Cup finals, is easily the most prolific city.

Records

Notes

References

External links
 Official site
 The Romanian Cup on the FRF's official site

 
1
National association football cups
1933 establishments in Romania
Recurring sporting events established in 1933
Annual sporting events in Romania